Jean-Michel Maulpoix was born on November 11, 1952 in Montbéliard, Doubs.

The author of more than twenty volumes of French poetry (in blank verse fragments and in prose) and of several volumes of essays and criticism, he teaches modern French literature at the University Paris X Nanterre and is the director of the quarterly literary journal Le Nouveau Recueil. He is an alumnus of the École normale supérieure de Saint-Cloud.

His most acclaimed work 'Une histoire de bleu' (translated in English as 'A Matter of Blue') consists of prose poems and blank verse in which, writes translator Dawn Cornelio, he 'uses the color blue to encompass melancholy and nostalgia, but also the joy and hope inherent in life'.

He is webmaster of his own website, in French, English and Spanish.

External links
 maulpoix.net
Jean-Michel Maulpoix & Co.: Modern and contemporary french literature site maintained by Maulpoix

1952 births
Living people
Writers from Montbéliard
French poets
ENS Fontenay-Saint-Cloud-Lyon alumni
French male poets